The Endeavour Bridge is a road bridge that carries the General Holmes Drive (A1) across the Cooks River, from  to  in the Bayside Council local government area in southern Sydney, New South Wales, Australia. The bridge is located adjacent to the river mouth, where the Cooks River empties into Botany Bay.

The bridge is maintained by Roads & Maritime Services, an agency of the Government of New South Wales.

History 
The Endeavour Bridge was opened to traffic in May 1951 as two, two-lane bridges. The road carries motor vehicles and a grade-separated pedestrian footpath.

It was built due to the diversion of Cooks River required by the expansion of Kingsford-Smith Airport. The bridges were constructed before the water flow was diverted beneath them.

In 1963 the two bridges were widened by extending their decks into the area between them, resulting in one six-lane bridge. This upgrade was undertaken in conjunction with the upgrade of General Holmes Drive from four to six lanes, which was the first upgrading of a 'county road' as part of the County of Cumberland Planning Scheme.

Etymology
Lieutenant Cook and the crew of the Endeavour were the first recorded European expedition to navigate and map the eastern coastline of Australia. They arrived in nearby Botany Bay in 1770.

See also

 List of bridges in Sydney

References

External links

 

Bridges in Sydney
Cooks River
Botany Bay
Bridges completed in 1951
1951 establishments in Australia
Road bridges in New South Wales
Highway 1 (Australia)
Kyeemagh, New South Wales
Mascot, New South Wales